Lista ficki is a species of moth of the family Pyralidae. It is found in Japan and Taiwan.

References

Moths described in 1881
Epipaschiinae
Moths of Japan